Nasrullah Khan Zayrai, or Nasrullah Khan Bareach, is a Pashtun politician who is elected twice as a Member of the Provincial Assembly of Balochistan, from May 2013 to May 2018 and On 25 July 2018 elections. He is the current Provincial Secretary of PMAP. He is well known for his humanitarian services in his region. He is known for his services in field of education, development, building infrastructure and passing bills on important political and social issues of the province. His speeches in provincial assembly throughout his career as MPA has been full of truth, ground realities and well heard and appreciated by masses. He remained in student politics and was one of the founding member of Pashtoonkhwa Students Organization. He was arrested several times during General Musharraf regime on his pro democratic campaign in educational institutions of Balochistan. He is well learned speaker in Balochistan Assembly. His staunch rivals accepts his honesty and dedication for politics.

Early life and education 
He was born on 8 March 1966 in Quetta.

He completed his early education from Historic Sandman High School Quetta and his Higher secondary education from Govt Science College Quetta. He started his political career in early 80's as a young Student in Science College Quetta from the platform of Pashtoonkhwa Students Organization (PSO).

He has a degree in Master of Science and a degree in the Bachelor of Laws.

He is an advocate by profession.

Political career

He was elected to the Provincial Assembly of Balochistan as a candidate of Pashtunkhwa Milli Awami Party from Constituency PB-5 Quetta-V in 2013 Pakistani general election. He was again elected from PB-31 Quetta VIII and now served as Parliamentary Leader of Pashtoonkhwa Milli Awami Party in Balochistan Assembly. He remained as chairman standing committee on foods and agriculture. He is member of public accounts committee and several other in house committees.

References

Living people
Balochistan MPAs 2013–2018
1966 births